Edwin García Feliciano (born April 8, 1960) is a Puerto Rican politician and was mayor of Camuy until 2020. García is affiliated with the New Progressive Party (PNP) and has served as mayor since 2002. In 1984 obtained a Bachelor degree in Arts with a focus on Political Science at the University of Puerto Rico. Has a juris doctor from the University of Puerto Rico School of Law. In 2020 Puerto Rico governor Wanda Vázquez Garced submitted the nomination of Edwin Garcia Feliciano as the Puerto Rico Ombudsman.

References

1960 births
Living people
Ombudspersons in Puerto Rico
Mayors of places in Puerto Rico
People from Camuy, Puerto Rico
New Progressive Party (Puerto Rico) politicians
University of Puerto Rico alumni